Jemez Valley Public Schools is a public school district headquartered in unincorporated Sandoval County, New Mexico, United States; the facility has a Jemez Pueblo postal address, but it is outside of (north of) the Jemez Pueblo census-designated place.

The school district has a total of 4 schools: 1 high school, 1 middle school, 1 elementary school, and 1 charter school.

Service area
Jemez Valley Public Schools serves: Cañon, Jemez Pueblo, Jemez Springs, La Cueva,  San Ysidro, Zia Pueblo, most of Ponderosa, and small sections of Rio Rancho, Rio Rancho Estates, and Santa Ana Pueblo. It also serves the neighboring communities of Sierra Los Pinos and Gilman.

Schools
Zoned:
 Jemez Valley High School
 Jemez Valley Middle School
 Jemez Valley Elementary School

Charter school
 San Diego Riverside Charter School

References

External links
 Jemez Valley Public Schools

School districts in New Mexico
Jemez Mountains
Education in Sandoval County, New Mexico